Verbena urticifolia, known as nettle-leaved vervain or white vervain, is a herbaceous plant in the vervain family (Verbenaceae). It belongs to the "true" vervains of genus Verbena.

Description
White vervain has opposite, simple leaves on thin, rigid, green stems. The serrated leaves look similar to those of Urtica, which is the reason for the plant being named urticifolia. The small flowers are borne in spikes; they open in summer and unusually for this normally bluish-flowered genus are white. The fruit is a dark-colored capsule with many brown and thin seeds. The entire plant except for the flowers and fruit is covered in stiff bristles.

Range
White vervain is native to eastern North America, excluding Mexico.

Habitat
White vervain is commonly found growing individually in disturbed areas with partial shade.  It prefers mesic habitats.

Relation to other vervains
This species may be closest to a group that might include such North American species as V. lasiostachys or V. menthifolia, and the common vervain (V. officinalis) from Europe. Like these, it is diploid with a total of 14 chromosomes. The relationship of the swamp verbena (V. hastata) to these other species is more enigmatic; its evolution might have involved hybridization with the white vervain or a related species in the past.

Footnotes

References
 Yuan, Yao-Wu & Olmstead, Richard G. (2008): A species-level phylogenetic study of the Verbena complex (Verbenaceae) indicates two independent intergeneric chloroplast transfers. Molecular Phylogenetics and Evolution 48(1): 23–33.

External links

 

urticifolia
Flora of Western Canada
Plants described in 1753
Taxa named by Carl Linnaeus
Flora of Eastern Canada
Flora of the Northeastern United States
Flora of the Southeastern United States
Flora of the North-Central United States
Flora of Texas
Flora without expected TNC conservation status